Albert Ireton (15 May 1879 in Baldock – 4 January 1947) was a British tug of war competitor and boxer who competed in the 1908 Summer Olympics.

In 1908 he was part of the British team City of London Police which won gold medal in the tug of war competition. He also participated in the heavyweight boxing event but was eliminated in the first round.

References

External links
profile

1879 births
1947 deaths
City of London Police officers
People from Baldock
Heavyweight boxers
Olympic boxers of Great Britain
Olympic tug of war competitors of Great Britain
Boxers at the 1908 Summer Olympics
Tug of war competitors at the 1908 Summer Olympics
Olympic gold medallists for Great Britain
Olympic medalists in tug of war
British male boxers
Medalists at the 1908 Summer Olympics